Chromium(II) oxalate is an inorganic compound with the chemical formula CrC2O4.

Preparation 
According to Nikumbh et al, CrC2O4·2H2O can be prepared from chromium(II) sulfate pentahydrate by reaction with a mixture of sodium oxalate and oxalic acid in degassed aqueous solution, forming a light green crystalline product, which has been characterized by combustion elemental analysis, infrared spectroscopy, thermogravimetric analysis and powder X-ray diffraction. The measured magnetic moment of 4.65 B.M. suggests that the chromium ion does not form a Cr-Cr bond and has a high-spin octahedral coordination geometry. This would be consistent with the structure of other linear polymeric metal(II) oxalates of general formula MC2O4·2H2O (M = Mg, Fe, etc.). The dihydrate loses water to form anhydrous CrC2O4 when heated above 140 °C in an inert atmosphere. Heating above 320 °C produces a mixture of chromium oxides.

Milburn and Taube have presented data indicating that chromium(II) will reduce oxalate to glycolate within a few minutes in acidic aqueous solutions, casting some doubt on the formulation of chromium(II) oxalate as a stable Cr2+ species if prepared from acidic aqueous solutions.

References 

Chromium(II) compounds
Oxalates
Chromium–oxygen compounds